Ho Kam-Fai  (born 10 June 1933) is a former member of the Legislative Council of Hong Kong.

Ho obtained a postgraduate diploma in Social Study at the University of Hong Kong and finished his master and doctoral degrees in Social Work at Columbia University. He taught at the Chinese University of Hong Kong, where he eventually became Director of the Department of Extramural Studies. He was appointed to the Legislative Council of Hong Kong in 1978 by Governor Murray MacLehose and served until 1988.

Ho was also the member of the Po Leung Kuk Advisory Board.

References

1933 births
Living people
Academic staff of the Chinese University of Hong Kong
Commanders of the Order of the British Empire
Columbia University School of Social Work alumni
Alumni of the University of Hong Kong
HK LegCo Members 1985–1988